Fabio Viviani may refer to:

 Fabio Viviani (chef) (born 1978), Italian chef who competed in the TV show Top Chef
 Fabio Viviani (footballer) (born 1966), Italian football player and coach